Paul Roger Lawrence (April 26, 1922 – November 1, 2011) was an American sociologist, Professor of Organizational Behavior at the Harvard Business School, and consultant, known from his work with Jay W. Lorsch on "Differentiation and integration in complex organizations."

Biography
Born in Rochelle, Illinois, Lawrence obtained his A.B. from Albion College in 1943, and after World War II at Harvard Business School his MBA in 1947 and his PhD in 1950.

After graduation Lawrence started his lifelong academic career at Harvard University in 1947 as Instructor. He was appointed Assistant Professor in 1950, Associate Professor in 1956, and Full Professor in 1960. From 1967 to 1991 he was Wallace Brett Donham Professor of Organizational Behavior. He has been Visiting Professor at the Massachusetts Institute of Technology in 1973, and at the University of California, Berkeley in 1984. From 1975 to 1993 he has also been Director at Millipore Corporation, and from 1991 to 1995 Director at the Hollingsworth & Vose Paper Company.

Lawrence was elected Fellow of the Academy of Management, and of the International Academy of Management, and member of the American Sociological Association and the Society for the Advancement of Socio-Economics.

Selected publications
Turner, Arthur N., and Paul R. Lawrence. Industrial jobs and the worker. Harvard Univ., 1965.
Davis, S. M., Lawrence, P. R., Kolodny, H., & Beer, M. (1977). Matrix (Vol. 1115). Reading, MA: Addison-Wesley.
Lawrence, Paul R., and Jay W. Lorsch. Organization and Environment: Managing Differentiation and Integration. Harvard Business School Classics. (1986).

Articles, a selection
Lawrence, Paul R., and Jay W. Lorsch. "Differentiation and integration in complex organizations." Administrative science quarterly (1967): 1-47.
Lawrence, Paul R., and Jay W. Lorsch. "Managing differentiation and integration." Organization and environment (1967).
Johnston, Russell, and Paul R. Lawrence. "Beyond vertical integration–the rise of the value-adding partnership." Thompson, G.(et al.)(Eds.), Markets, hierarchies and networks, The Coordination of Social Life, Sage, London (1991): 193-202.

References

External links 

 Harvard Business School Professor Paul. R. Lawrence Dies at 89

Archives and records
Paul R. Lawrence papers at Baker Library Special Collections, Harvard Business School.

1922 births
2011 deaths
American business theorists
American sociologists
Albion College alumni
Harvard Business School alumni
Harvard University faculty
People from Rochelle, Illinois